Danièle Gégauff (née Rosencranz, died 2007) was a French actress and line producer. She was married to the French actor and screenwriter Paul Gégauff. Danièle Gégauff worked with executive producer Stéphane Tchalgadjieff.

Danièle Gégauff played Esther in Claude Chabrol's movie Une partie de plaisir. Her husband in the film was played by her real husband Paul.

Filmography

Actress 
Merry-Go-Round of Jacques Rivette (1981).
Une Femme au bout de la nuit of Daniel Daërt (1980).
Les Enfants du placard of Benoît Jacquot (1977).
Une partie de plaisir of Claude Chabrol (1975).

Line producer 
Eros of Michelangelo Antonioni / Steven Soderbergh / Wong Kar-Wai (segment "The Dangerous Thread of Things") (as Danielle Rosencranz) (2004).
Le Chien, le Général et les Oiseaux of Francis Nielsen (2003).
Al di là delle nuvole of Michelangelo Antonioni / Wim Wenders (as Danielle Gégauff Rosencranz) (1995).
Aïda of Pierre Jourdan (1977).
Baxter, Vera Baxter of Marguerite Duras (as Danielle Gégauff) (1977).
Out 1, noli me tangere of Jacques Rivette (as Danielle Gégauff) (1971).

References

External links

  Danièle Gégauff at the allocine.fr 

Year of birth missing
2007 deaths
French film actresses
20th-century French actresses
Place of birth missing
French film producers